In Greek mythology, Theophane (Ancient Greek: Θεοφάνη) was a daughter of Bisaltes.

Mythology 
In consequence of Theophane's extraordinary beauty, she was beleaguered by lovers, but was carried off by Poseidon to the isle of Crinissa. As the lovers followed her there, Poseidon metamorphosed the maiden into a sheep and himself into a ram, and turned all the inhabitants of the island into animals. As the lovers began to slaughter these animals, he changed them into wolves. The god then became, by Theophane, the father of the ram with the golden fleece, which carried Phrixus to Colchis.

Note

References

 Gaius Julius Hyginus, Fabulae from The Myths of Hyginus translated and edited by Mary Grant. University of Kansas Publications in Humanistic Studies. Online version at the Topos Text Project.

Mortal parents of demigods in classical mythology
Metamorphoses into animals in Greek mythology
Women of Poseidon